Karen Marte is an American former slalom canoeist who competed in the early 1980s. She won a bronze medal in the mixed C-2 event at the 1981 ICF Canoe Slalom World Championships in Bala, Gwynedd, Wales.

References

American female canoeists
Living people
Year of birth missing (living people)
Medalists at the ICF Canoe Slalom World Championships
21st-century American women